Rozsika Parker (27 December 1945 – 5 November 2010) was a British psychotherapist, art historian and writer and a feminist.

Biography
Parker was born in London and spent her early years in Oxford, studying at Wychwood School.

Between the years 1966–1969, Parker studied for a degree in the history of European art at the Courtauld Institute in London. in 1972 she joined the feminist magazine Spare Rib. She and Griselda Pollock then went on to found a feminist group, The Feminist Art History Collective. 

In the 1980s, Parker had two children with the Jungian analyst Andrew Samuels, a boy and a girl.

Parker died in 2010 at age 64 of cancer.

Legacy
In 2013, the Rozsika Parker Essay Prize was established by the British Journal of Psychotherapy.

Parker's contention that embroidery was a way to educate women and a weapon for resistance helped develop computational fiber arts as Anastasia Salter notes in her essay, Re:traced Threads: Generating Feminist Textile Art with Tracery.

Books
Old Mistresses: Women, Art and Ideology, with Griselda Pollock (1981)
The Subversive Stitch: Embroidery and the Making of the Feminine (1984)
 Framing Feminism: Art and the Women's Movement 1970–1985 (1987)
The Subversive Stitch: Embroidery and the Making of the Feminine (1989)
Torn in Two: Experience of Maternal Ambivalence (1995)
 Mother Love, Mother Hate: The Power of Maternal Ambivalence (1996)
The Anxious Gardener (2006)

References

External links
 Melissa Benn, "Deep maternal alienation", The Guardian, 28 October 2006
 "In Memoriam: Rozsika Parker, Feminist Art Historian and activist"
 Interview with Griselda Pollock about Rosie Parker, Last Word, BBC Radio 4, 3 December 2012.

1945 births
2010 deaths
People from London
Alumni of the Courtauld Institute of Art
British art historians
Women art historians
Feminist historians
Feminist studies scholars
English feminist writers
Feminist theorists
British women historians